A Moment is the second album of R&B singer Lalah Hathaway. The album's first single was "Let Me Love You," produced by Brian Alexander Morgan of SWV fame. A video was also shot for the single. The follow-up single was "Separate Ways," released as a double-A side single with "Family Affair." The Martyn Ware-produced "Family Affair" was actually released in 1991 and billed as "BEF featuring Lalah Hathaway".

The CD format of the album is now rare and out-of-print, but is available as a digital download in the iTunes Store.

Track listing

Singles

"Let Me Love You"
Cassette Single:
 "Let Me Love You"
 "Dreams Don't Lie" (Club Version)

12" Single: 
Side A
 "Let Me Love You" (Central Park Mix) — 4:33
 "Let Me Love You" (Bread And Butter Girl Wonder Mix) — 5:45
 "Let Me Love You" (Queen Of The Planet Mix) — 4:37
Side B
 "Let Me Love You" (Extended Mix) — 6:30
 "Let Me Love You" (Bounce Club Mix) — 5:52
 "Dreams Don't Lie" (Club Version) — 5:57

Promo CD: 
 "Let Me Love You" (Single Edit) — 4:06
 "Let Me Love You" (Central Park Mix) — 4:53
 "Let Me Love You" (Bed Time Mix) — 5:06
 "Let Me Love You" (Bread And Butter Girl Wonder Mix) — 5:45
 "Let Me Love You" (All Star Remix) — 4:39
 "Let Me Love You" (Album Instrumental) — 5:26

"Separate Ways"/"Family Affair"
Cassette Single/Promo CD:
 "Separate Ways" (radio edit) — 4:00
 "Separate Ways" (stringapella) — 4:11
 "Family Affair" (album version) — 4:04
 "Family Affair" (plati party mix edit) — 4:26

"Family Affair" (12" Single) 
Side A
 Plati Party Mix
 Plati Party Mix Edit
Side B
 Booming Percaletta Mix
 Instrumental with Billy Preston

Other:
 "Let Me Love You" (Tim Prezzano Hot Tracks Mix) from Various Artists – Best of Street Tracks Vol. 5 – Hot Tracks CD

References

External links
 

1994 albums
Lalah Hathaway albums
Albums produced by Chuckii Booker
Virgin Records albums